Kékéland is the fourteenth album by experimental French singer Brigitte Fontaine, released in 2001 on the Virgin Records label. It is almost entirely composed of collaborations. Fontaine exceptionally wrote two songs in English (Kékéland and God's Nightmare). Y'a des zazous is one of her rare covers, of French singer Andrex.

Because of the number of high-profile artists featured on the album, it had a better promotion and sold well, being certified gold record with more than 130,000 albums sold, a first for Fontaine.

Track listing

Charts

Brigitte Fontaine albums
2001 albums
Virgin Records albums